Union County is a county in the U.S. state of Kentucky. As of the 2020 United States census, the population was 13,668. Its county seat is Morganfield. The county was created effective January 15, 1811.

The county is located on the left (east) bank of the Ohio River opposite its confluence with the Wabash River. Union County, along with neighboring Posey County, Indiana, and Gallatin County, Illinois, form the tri-point of the Illinois-Indiana-Kentucky Tri-State Area.

Geography
Union County lies on the northern border of Kentucky; its northwestern border is formed by the meanders of the Ohio River, abutting the states of Illinois and Indiana. The county terrain consists of frequent low wooded hills among the level areas, which are devoted to agriculture. Its highest point ( ASL) is a rise in the Chalybeate Hills, in the Higginson-Henry Wildlife Management Area.

Construction of the dam was begun in 1965 by the U.S. Army Corps of Engineers and completed in 1977. It was renamed on 12 October 1996, to honor retired Indiana congressman John T. Myers.

Union County is part of the Western Coal Fields region of Kentucky.

Adjacent counties

 Posey County, Indiana − north
 Henderson County − northeast
 Webster County − southeast
 Crittenden County − south
 Hardin County, Illinois − west
 Gallatin County, Illinois −northwest

Protected areas
 Higginson-Henry Wildlife Management Area (state) 
 Moffit Lake Recreation Area (county)

Highways
  U.S. Route 60
  KY 56
  KY 109

Cities
 Morganfield
 Sturgis
 Uniontown
 Waverly

Census-designated places
 Breckinridge Center

Unincorporated communities

 Bordley
 Boxville
 Caseyville
 Cullen
 Curlew
 Dekoven
 Grangertown
 Grove Center
 Henshaw
 Pride
 Spring Grove
 Sullivan
 The Rocks

Demographics

2010 census
As of the 2010 Census, the population was 15,007. Of this, 85.45% were White, 12.05% were Black or African American, 1.49% were two or more races, 0.44% were some other race, 0.34% were Asian, 0.19% were American Indian or Alaska Native, 0.05% were Native Hawaiian or other Pacific Islander. Hispanic or Latino (of any race) were 1.62% of the population

2000 census
As of the 2000 United States Census, there were 15,637 people, 5,710 households, and 4,082 families in the county. The racial makeup of the county was 85.04% White, 12.89% Black or African American, 0.17% Native American, 0.15% Asian, 0.39% from other races, and 1.37% from two or more races. 1.56% of the population were Hispanic or Latino of any race.

There were 5,710 households, out of which 32.10% had children under the age of 18 living with them, 56.50% were married couples living together, 11.40% had a female householder with no husband present, and 28.50% were non-families. 26.10% of all households were made up of individuals, and 12.40% had someone living alone who was 65 years of age or older. The average household size was 2.50 and the average family size was 2.99.

25.30% of the population was under the age of 18, 13.80% from 18 to 24, 25.50% from 25 to 44, 22.50% from 45 to 64, and 12.90% who were 65 years of age or older. The median age was 34 years. For every 100 females there were 101.80 males. For every 100 females age 18 and over, there were 99.30 males.

The median income for a household in the county was $35,018, and the median income for a family was $43,103. Males had a median income of $30,244 versus $20,817 for females. The per capita income for the county was $17,465. About 9.30% of families and 17.70% of the population were below the poverty line, including 18.30% of those under age 18 and 11.70% of those age 65 or over.

Education
Public schools are managed by Union County Public Schools. The three public elementary schools in the county are located in Morganfield, Sturgis, and Uniontown. The county has one public middle school and one public high school, Union County High School. Located near Morganfield, Kentucky, it is known for its wrestling program. John Paul II Catholic School, the county's only private school, in Morganfield, holds preschool, elementary, and middle school classes.

Libraries
There are three libraries in Union County, with the main branch in Morganfield and branches in Sturgis and Uniontown.tic experience for grades K-5. The library supplies the county with educational resources such as computers with internet access. There are several programs for children:
 Time for Tots is a range of activities including music, dancing, crafts, stories, and more. For ages 6 months to 5 years;
 Blox’ N Bots is a hands-on robotic experience for grades K-5;
 Between You and Me is a program for middle and high school students and an adult family member. Which includes crafts, games, and activities.

Access to KY Virtual Library provides:
• Britannica Digital Learning
• Databases
• EBSCO
• Kentucky Virtual Library
• LearningExpress Library
• NoveList
• ProQuest
• Scholastic GO!
• TeenBookCloud (pilot)
• WorldCat (OCLC)

The Union County Public Library District offers test-proctoring services at the Morganfield location.

Children's online educational resources include:
• ABCya
• Bob the builder
• CoolMath4Kids
• Dr. Seuss
• Fun with Spot
• KidzPage
• Little Critter
• Littlest Pet Shop
• Neopets
• Nick Jr.
• Nickelodeon
• PBS Kids
• Ramo Math games
• Star Wars
• Turtle Diary
• Typing games

Ready Reference Links include:
Fast Facts, Health, Jobs, Kentucky Driver's Tests, Kentucky Legal Assistance Information, Kentucky Links, Kids, Language, Newspapers, People,
Senior Links, Staff Resources, Tax Information, Teen Links, and Union County Links

Politics
Union County was a longtime Democratic stronghold in presidential elections. However, it gradually shifted to supporting Republican candidates. In 2016, Donald Trump won more than three fourths of the county's vote.

Notable people
 Ben M. Bogard, lived as a child in Union County; became a Baptist minister and was involved with the Landmarkism Movement.
 Dwane Casey, longtime NBA head coach, currently the head coach of the Detroit Pistons.
 Ormsby M. Mitchel, astronomer and major general during the American Civil War
 Isaiah L. Potts (1784?-after 1843), tavern keeper of the notorious Potts Tavern who, allegedly, ran a gang of highwaymen and murderers on the Illinois frontier
 William L. O'Daniel (1923−2017), a Union County farmer who served in the Illinois General Assembly

See also
 National Register of Historic Places listings in Union County, Kentucky

References

External links

 
 Union County Public Schools, Kentucky
 Union County Economic Development
 2010 Census Data

 
Kentucky counties
Kentucky counties on the Ohio River
1811 establishments in Kentucky
Populated places established in 1811